Simply Terrific is a 1938 British comedy film directed by Roy William Neill and starring Claude Hulbert, Reginald Purdell and Patricia Medina. It was made at Teddington Studios by the British subsidiary of Warner Bros.

Plot

Cast
 Claude Hulbert as Rodney Cherridew  
 Reginald Purdell as Sam Todd  
 Zoe Wynn as Goldie Divine  
 Patricia Medina as Heather Carfax  
 Aubrey Mallalieu as Sir Walter Carfax  
 Glen Alyn as Stella Hemingway  
 Hugh French as Dickie  
 Laura Wright as Annie Hemingway  
 Ian McLean as Foster 
 Frederick Burtwell

References
Notes

Bibliography
 Low, Rachael. Filmmaking in 1930s Britain. George Allen & Unwin, 1985.

External links

1938 films
Films directed by Roy William Neill
1938 comedy films
British comedy films
Films shot at Teddington Studios
Warner Bros. films
Films set in England
British black-and-white films
1930s English-language films
1930s British films